Jutphaas is a former village and municipality in the province of Utrecht in the Netherlands. The municipality merged with Vreeswijk in 1971, and is now the northern half of the town of Nieuwegein.

The former village was located on the Merwedekanaal, and some of the buildings can still be found there, surrounded by the suburbs of Nieuwegein.

External links 

Former populated places in the Netherlands
Populated places in Utrecht (province)
Former municipalities of Utrecht (province)
Nieuwegein